The Battle of Haifa, called by the Jewish forces Operation Bi'ur Hametz ( "Passover Cleaning"), was a Haganah operation carried out on 21–22 April 1948 and was a major event in the final stages of the civil war in Palestine, leading up to the 1948 Arab-Israeli War. The objective of the operation was the capture of the Arab neighborhoods of Haifa. By mid-May 1948 only 4,000 from the pre-conflict population estimate of 65,000 Palestinian Arabs remained in the city.

Background 
The city of Haifa, on the Mediterranean coast at the north-western edge of the Sharon plain, was a strategic location in Palestine. Haifa was the country's largest deep water port. The head of the spur line to the Hejaz railway was the oil terminal for the Mosul/Haifa pipe line, which the Iraqi Government had closed in April, and was home to the Consolidated Refineries oil refinery. With the capture of the port of Haifa it would be possible for the Haganah to receive supplies and armaments during the impending Arab-Israeli conflict. Therefore the leadership of the provisional government of Israel considered it vital for the welfare of the new state. Moreover, Haifa was within the area allocated to a Jewish state under the United Nations Partition Plan for Palestine.

In 1948, Haifa was a mixed city with a population of 135,000, split between Palestinian Jews (70,000) and Palestinian Arabs (65,000). The Arab proportion of the population had, since early 1948, started to dwindle. The main Palestinian Jewish areas of the city were Hadar HaCarmel and Neve Sha'anan; with Khalisa and Wadi Nisnas being predominantly Palestinian Arab. The civil war in Palestine escalated with the final stages of the British Mandate.  In Jerusalem, by January 1947 the British had evacuated 2,000 subjects for their own safety. In the wake of the British civil evacuation, the families of well-to-do Arabs and many of the Arab civic leaders also decamped. Some claimed that the Arab leaders encouraged the Palestinian Arabs to leave by running away themselves. This so frightened the now leaderless mass who had stayed behind, that, encouraged by atrocity propaganda, it fled as well. It is claimed that they prevented a truce settlement in Haifa. The refusal of the “Arab League“ to intervene had been a cause of widespread demoralisation of the Palestinian Arab population. By mid March 25,000 to 30,000 Palestinian Arabs had already evacuated from Haifa.

Haganah's April offensive – including Operation Nachshon to open the Tel-Aviv-Jerusalem road and Operation Yiftah to control eastern Galilea – appeared to take the Arab Higher Committee (AHC) by surprise. The Haifa Arab National Committee (NC) in communique number 7, 22February, demanded of the Palestinian Arab inhabitants that they cease all shooting and return to work. The Palestinian Arab half of Haifa was remote from other major Palestinian Arab centres and contact had been cut off by the Palestinian Jewish villages along the approach roads to Haifa. Businesses and workshops had closed with no prospect of continued employment. Unemployment was rife and the cost of food had escalated.

Preparations
On 17March 1948 Mohammad bin Hammad Al Huneiti, commander of the town's Arab militia, was killed in an ambush of a convoy bringing 15 tons of arms and explosives. His death left his followers demoralised. According to Jon Kimche the Haganah had a highly placed informer and were able to intercept nine of eleven Palestinian Arab arms convoys into Haifa. The Arab garrison of the Palestinian Arab areas of the city was commanded by Captain Amin Izz al-Din who had been appointed by the Arab Liberation Army's (ALA) military committee on 27March in Damascus. Through the next month his original force of 450 was depleted by desertion until it was no longer a fighting force.

The British had previously controlled the city and maintained a buffer between the Jewish and Arab populations. In preparation for the total evacuation of all British forces from the mandate, the British began an evacuation of troops through the port of Haifa in early April. A volunteer police force had been established in preparation of handing over to the United Nations Palestine Commission as the provisional Government of Palestine. The original British Government intentions had been to evacuate Palestine gradually from south to north of Palestine, using Haifa as the embarkation port, to be completed by mid May. On the same day as the fall of Tiberias, 18April 1948, Major-General Hugh Stockwell, British Commanding Officer, Northern sector, Haifa, summoned Harry Beilin, the Jewish Agency liaison officer to the British Army, to his headquarters. Stockwell informed Beilin of his intention to immediately start to evacuate the British forces from the borders and no-man's-land zones in Haifa and that the evacuation would be completed by 20April. The Haganah saw this change of plan as an opportunity and quickly prepared a 3-pronged attack on the Arab neighborhoods of Wadi Nisnas, Wadi Salib and Khalisa.

The German Colony at Waldheim and Bethlehem had been confined until 18April 1948 when Haganah forces attacked the area killing two unarmed internees and wounding four others. Haganah also occupied the German Colony and the internees requested evacuation to Australia. The 270–300 internees were evacuated to Egypt on 20April for transit to Australia as a matter of urgency. The remaining 50 Templers emigrated after the establishment of the State of Israel.

On 20April Captain Amin Bey Izz al-Din and Beilin were summoned to the British HQ and were advised of the British intention to withdraw as per the previous meeting where only Beilin and Stockwell had attended on 18 April. Izz al-Din promptly left for Damascus to report to the Military Committee of the ALA and handed over command to Yunnis Naffa, a Palestinian sanitary engineer. The departure of Izz al-Din led to demoralisation and on 21 April prominent members of the Haifa NC (Hakim Khalil and Ahmad Bay Khalil) evacuated.

The sudden British deployment caused the Carmeli commanders to re-work the details of the operation (previously a plan called Operation Misparayim or Operation Scissors). The revised plan was named Mivtza Bi'ur Hametz (Operation Passover Cleaning).

The battle

The Haganah's force consisted of 5 companies from the Field Corps, one Palmach company, and a contingent of the Guard Corps. The Palestinian Jewish forces attacked Wadi Salib and Wadi Nisnas from Hadar HaCarmel, while the bulk of the attack on Khalisa came from Neve Sha'anan. The Arab headquarters were in the center of the city, near the port and the railway depot.

Commenting on the use of 'psychological warfare broadcasts' and military tactics in Haifa, Benny Morris wrote:
Throughout the Haganah made effective use of Arabic language broadcasts and loudspeaker vans. Haganah Radio announced that 'the day of judgement had arrived' and called on inhabitants to 'kick out the foreign criminals' and to 'move away from every house and street, from every neighbourhood occupied by foreign criminals'. The Haganah broadcasts called on the populace to 'evacuate the women, the children and the old immediately, and send them to a safe haven'... Jewish tactics in the battle were designed to stun and quickly overpower opposition; demoralisation was a primary aim. It was deemed just as important to the outcome as the physical destruction of the Arab units. The mortar barrages and the psychological warfare broadcasts and announcements, and the tactics employed by the infantry companies, advancing from house to house, were all geared to this goal. The orders of Carmeli's 22nd Battalion were 'to kill every [adult male] Arab encountered' and to set alight with fire-bombs 'all objectives that can be set alight. I am sending you posters in Arabic; disperse on route'.

Jon Kimche also describes the "psychological blitz on Arab quarters" until "the Arab nerve broke and the flight from the town assumed panic proportions".

The first attack was on the Rushmiyya Bridge area cutting the Arab areas off. Prior to the main thrust from the higher ground of the Palestinian Jewish neighbourhood, Hadar HaCarmel, the Arab Muslim neighborhood of Khalisa came under mortar bombardment. The 3,500–5,000 Arab irregulars could not mount a real defense. The following day the Arab National Committee of Haifa were prepared to ask for a truce via Stockwell. Stockwell agreed to meet with the Israelis, and returned 15 minutes later. However, the terms proposed by the Haganah – complete disarmament, surrender of weapons, and a curfew – were not accepted by the Arab leadership.

After the release of prisoners from Haifa lock-up, the Arab legion took over the building. By 10:15 Arab casualties had been admitted to the Amin Hospital. Hospital staff and casualties were then evacuated to the Government Hospital in the city. Towards midday the fighting slackened. The Jews had complete control of the Khamra square and Stanton Street and were firing from positions in the Suq (market) area. They had also appeared in strength in the eastern quarter of the town from Wadi Husimiyah Bridge to Tel Amal. Arab women, children and others were still being evacuated from the Suq area through the port of Haifa and other safe areas. Arabs were by this time suing for a truce and the Jews replied that they were prepared to consider it if the Arabs stopped shooting. At 17:00 general Arab resistance had ceased in the eastern area with the exception of a few isolated spots and the Jews were in possession of the Suq as far as the eastern gate. In the Wadi Miamr area the battle was still going on. Arab casualties in this area are believed to have been considerable. At 18:00 the Arab leaders met to consider the terms laid down at a joint meeting of Arab and Jews.

That afternoon a meeting was held in the town hall to discuss terms of the truce. Due to the inability of the National Committee (Haifa) to guarantee that no incidents would occur, the Arab delegation declared their inability to endorse the proposed truce and requested protection for the evacuation of Haifa's Palestinian Arab citizens. It was noted by The Times that the Haganah had made use of Arabic language broadcasts using Haganah Radio and loudspeaker vans calling on the inhabitants to "kick out the foreign criminals". Similarly the Haganah had broadcast that the Palestinian Arab population should "evacuate the women, the children and the old immediately and sent them to a safe haven".

By 22April 1948 the British were only in control of the Haifa port area. The rest of the city was in the hands of the Carmeli Brigade of the Haganah, commanded by Moshe Carmel.

Rashid al-Haj Ibrahim, a Palestinian Arab municipal leader, described the panic as being influenced by the 9 April 1948 Deir Yassin massacre, where 107 Palestinian Arab villagers were massacred by Zionist groups Irgun and Lehi:

The banner headlines of the Palestine Post on 23April 1948 announced "Haifa Pivotal Points fall to Haganah forces in 30-hour battle...". The report continued that "Haganah crushed all resistance, occupied many major buildings forcing thousands of Arabs to flee by the only open route-the sea". The report was written up on 21April but not printed until 30April, presumedly for security reasons. Estimates of the number of Arabs killed vary; one Jewish source puts the number at 300.

Aftermath

On 23April Moshe Carmel declared Martial Law in the town. On the same day units from the Irgun moved into parts of downtown Haifa. Two days later the Haganah forced them to withdraw in a confrontation that resulted in some Irgun casualties. Some reports speak of looting and attacks on civilians. Moshe Dayan was appointed to administer abandoned Arab property in the city. He instituted a policy of collecting anything the army could use and storing it in Zahal warehouses, with the rest distributed among Jewish agricultural settlements. Golda Meir, who was consulted, agreed with this policy.

15,000 civilians were evacuated from Haifa during 21–22 April. Leaving some 30–45,000 non-Jewish citizens. By mid-May only 4,000 from the pre conflict population estimate of 65,000 Palestinian Arabs remained. These were concentrated in Wadi Nisnas and Wadi Salib whilst the systematic destruction of Arab housing in certain areas was implemented by Haifa's Technical and Urban Development departments in cooperation with the IDF's city commander Ya'akov Lublini.

"general situation Palestine deteriorating rapidly stop government departments closing daily stop and normal activities country coming to a stand still stop the Jewish agency is action as a general organizing body for Palestinian Jewish areas and attempting to replace suspended governmental activities stop Arab areas are depending on municipal authorities within townships and villages without any central authority stop telegraph facilities ceased in most areas as have telephone trunk lines stop telephones still work locally but with decreasing efficiency stop Lydda airport is out of operation and regular air communication and airmail service in and out of country have stopped stop intensity of fighting is increasing steadily stop camps and other important areas vacated by British forces immediately become battle grounds stop operations on larger and more important scale than Haifa expected shortly stop rumors tending to increase the nervous tension in the county.

See also
 List of battles and operations in the 1948 Palestine war
 Avraham Avigdorov  (1929–2012), Palmach fighter and hero of the 17 March 1948 battle

Footnotes

External links

 Google Books Benny Morris, Birth of the Palestinian Refugee Problem Revisited. (2004)
 Shay Fogelman, Port in a Storm, Ha'aretz, 3 June 2011.  The battle and its historiography.

Haifa
History of Haifa
April 1948 events in Asia